Vinkov Vrh is a village in the Municipality of Žužemberk in southeastern Slovenia. The area is part of the historical region of Lower Carniola. The municipality is now included in the Southeast Slovenia Statistical Region.

Geography
The settlement lies along the road from Dvor to Dolnji Ajdovec and includes the hamlet of Skopice to the northeast.

Church
The local church is dedicated to Saint Paul and belongs to the Parish of Žužemberk. It is a medieval building that was restyled in the Baroque style in the 17th century and was badly damaged in the Second World War and left in ruins. The church was restored and reconstructed in 2000.

References

External links
Vinkov Vrh at Geopedia

Populated places in the Municipality of Žužemberk